In Greek mythology, Erythia or Erytheia or Erythea (Ancient Greek: Ερυθεια from erythos "red") may refer to the following figures:

 Erythia, also called Erytheis (Ερυθεις), one of the Hesperides (Nymphs of the West).
 Erythia, daughter of Geryon and mother, by Hermes, of Norax, the man who led the Iberians to Sardinia.
 Erythia, the home of the above three-bodied giant Geryon.

Classic Literature Sources 
Chronological listing of classical literature sources for Erytheia:

 Euripides, Heracles Mad, 420 ff (trans. Coleridge) (Greek tragedy C5th BC)
 Aristotle, Meteorologica 2. 3 359a 26 ff (ed. Ross trans. Webster) (Greek philosopher C4th BC)
 Isocrates, Helen 24 ff (trans. Norlin) (Greek philosophy C4th BC)
 Pseudo-Aristotle, De Mirabilibus Auscultationibus 843b 133 (ed. Ross trans. Dowdall) (Greek rhetoric C4th to 3rd BC)
 Pseudo-Aristotle, De Mirabilibus Auscultationibus 844a
 Fragment, Stesichorus, The Tale of Geryon 5 (trans. Edmond 1920, Lyra Graeca Vol 2) (Greek commentary C1st to C1st AD)
 Strabo, Geography 3. 2. 11 (trans. Jones) (Greek geography C1st BC to C1st AD)
 Strabo, Geography 3. 5. 4
 Lucian, The Dance 56 ff (trans. Harmon) (Assyrian satirist C2nd AD)
 Oppian, Cynegetica 2. 109 ff (trans. Mair) (Greek poetry C2nd AD)
 Hippolytus, Philosophumena 5 The Ophite Heresies 25 (Philosophumena by Hippolytus, Legge 1921 Vol 1 p. 172) (Christian theology C3rd AD)
 Tzetzes, Chiliades or Book of Histories 2.4 330 ff (trans. Untila et al.) (Greco-Byzantine history C12th AD)
 Tzetzes, Chiliades or Book of Histories 2.4 337 ff
 Tzetzes, Chiliades or Book of Histories 2.4 500
 Tzetzes, Chiliades or Book of Histories 4.18 351
 Tzetzes, Chiliades or Book of Histories 5.38 879

Classical literature source for Erytheis:
 Apollonius Rhodius, Argonautica 4. 1422 ff (trans. Coleridge) (Greek epic poetry C3rd BC)

Chronological listing of classical literature sources for Erythia:

 Pliny, Natural History 4. 36. (trans. Bostock & Riley) (Roman historian C1st AD)
 Scholiast on Pliny, Natural History 4. 36 (The Natural History of Pliny trans. Bostock & Riley 1855 Vol 1 p. 369)
 Silius, Punica 16.193 ff (trans. Duff) (Roman epic poetry C1st AD)
 Pseudo-Apollodorus, The Library 1. 6. 1 ff (trans. Frazer) (Greek mythography C2nd AD)
 Pseudo-Apollodorus, The Library 2. 5. 10 ff
 Pseudo-Apollodorus, The Library 2. 5. 10 (trans. Frazer) (Greek mythography C2nd AD)
 Scholiast on Pseudo-Apollodorus, The Library 2. 5. 10 (Apollodorus The Library trans. Frazer 1921 Vol 1 p. 213)
 Pseudo-Apollodorus, The Library 2. 5. 11 ff (trans. Frazer) (Greek mythography C2nd AD)

Chronological listing of classical literature sources for Erythea:

 Hesiod, Theogony 289 ff (trans. Evelyn-White) (Greek epic poetry C8th to C7th BC)
 Hesiod, Theogony 983
 Herodotus, Herodotus 4. 8. 1 ff (trans. Godley) (Greek history C5th BC)
 Parthenius, The Love Romances, The Story of Celtine 30. 1 ff (trans. Gaselee) (Greek poetry C1st BC)
 Propertius, Elegies 4. 11. 1 ff (trans. Butler) (Latin poetry C1st BC)
 Ovid, Fasti 5. 645 ff (trans. Frazer) (Roman epic poetry C1st BC to C1st AD)
 Appian, Roman History, The Civil Wars 2. 39 ff (trans. White) (Greek history C2nd AD)
 Pausanias, Description of Greece 4. 36. 3 ff (trans. Frazer) (Greek travelogue C2nd AD)
 Pausanias, Description of Greece 5. 10. 2. 9 ff
 Pausanias, Description of Greece 10 17. 4
 Athenaeus, Banquet of the Learned 11. 38 ff (trans. Yonge) (Greek rhetoric C2nd AD to C3rd AD)
 Athenaeus, Banquet of the Learned 11. 39 (trans. Yonge) (Greek rhetoric C2nd AD to C3rd AD)

Notes

References 

 Pausanias, Description of Greece with an English Translation by W.H.S. Jones, Litt.D., and H.A. Ormerod, M.A., in 4 Volumes. Cambridge, MA, Harvard University Press; London, William Heinemann Ltd. 1918. . Online version at the Perseus Digital Library
 Pausanias, Graeciae Descriptio. 3 vols. Leipzig, Teubner. 1903.  Greek text available at the Perseus Digital Library.

Hesperides
Women of Hermes
Metamorphoses into trees in Greek mythology